Teen Lust is a 2014 Canadian teen comedy horror film directed by Blaine Thurier and written by Thurier and Jason Stone. The film had its world premiere on 10 September 2014 at the Toronto International Film Festival and stars Jesse Carere, Daryl Sabara and Annie Clark.

Plot
High school student Neil has taken an oath to remain celibate; an upcoming religious ceremony requires him to be a virgin. He's fully aware that his church is actually a Satan-worshiping cult, but only his parents and the other members know that this ceremony will involve actually sacrificing him to Satan. Not until during the ceremony, when Neil sees the dagger, does he realize what's about to happen; he and best friend Matt narrowly escape. Cult leader Sheldon sends members Collette and Brad to bring them back.

Matt and Neil realize Neil needs to lose his virginity to be safe. The two go to Neil's friend and crush Denise; he frantically explains his situation and asks her to have sex with him. She doesn't believe him. They have to run when Brad and Collette show up at her house. Denise realizes Neil really is being pursued and helps him escape from the cult.

Matt and Neil show up at Cheryl's party to get Neil laid. He's confronted by two bullies from school. Neil humiliates the bullies via a magic trick. Cheryl's so impressed that she leads him upstairs for sex. But before it can happen, Denise shows up, warning him that Brad and Collette are close. Neil and Matt narrowly escape, but Denise is kidnapped.

Neil and Matt's next plan is to use prostitutes. At the brothel, Matt loses his virginity. But before Neil gets his turn, the place is surrounded by cult members, tipped off by the prostitute. Matt distracts them so Neil and Denise can escape in one of their cars. Denise and Neil confess their feelings for each other; she wants him right then. He pulls over into an alley so they can have sex, but he's overexcited and ends up climaxing before intercourse. The cult members catch up with them and they're captured.

In a locked cell, Neil is ready to accept his fate. Matt is willing to offer himself for anal sex and take Neil's virginity if it will save his life. But before they can carry out the plan, they're taken to the altar room. Meanwhile, upstairs, Denise has knocked out her guard, Brad.

Neil is about to be sacrificed when Denise, who's infiltrated the altar room, knocks over a large candelabra, igniting the drapes behind the altar. The cult members back up in a panic. Denise climbs onto the altar and has sex with Neil while Matt uses that same candelabra to keep everyone at bay. With Neil's virginity taken, the cult's plan is ruined.

Some time later, Neil's parents have become devout Christians. Neil and Denise are now dating, and Matt is off to "bible study" with 3 pretty girls.

Cast
 Jesse Carere as Neil
 Daryl Sabara as Matt
 Annie Clark as Denise
 Jon Dore as Gary
 Emmanuelle Vaugier as Shelley
 Cary Elwes as Sheldon
 Kristin Bauer van Straten as Mary
 Jon Cor as Brad
 Amy Groening as Cheryl
 Matthew Enns as Kent
 Mackenzie Alton Johnson as Mac

Reception
The Hollywood Reporter panned Teen Lust, writing that it was "Uneven as a straightforward comedy and never pointed enough as a send-up of religion or sexuality." Joe Leydon of Variety also panned the film calling it a "conspicuously uninspired mix of teen-sex comedy and horror thriller tropes" but praised Cary Elwes' acting. Fangoria was more positive in their review and gave the film two and a half out of four skulls, as they felt that the movie did have "a few big laughs and a great premise" and that "It might be a missed opportunity, but at least it’s not a blown one."

References

External links
 
 

2014 films
2014 comedy horror films
2010s high school films
2010s sex comedy films
2010s teen comedy films
2010s teen horror films
2010s English-language films
Canadian comedy horror films
Canadian sex comedy films
Canadian teen comedy films
English-language Canadian films
Films about cults
Films about Satanism
Films about virginity
Films shot in Winnipeg
Teen sex comedy films
Films directed by Blaine Thurier
2010s Canadian films